This is a list of New Zealand television-related events in 1976.

Events
TV2 is renamed South Pacific Television

Debuts

Domestic
26 August - University Challenge (TV One) (1976-1989, 2014–present)
That's Country (TVNZ) (1976-1983)

International
5 February -  Shang-a-Lang (TV2)

Television shows
No information on television shows this year.

Ending this year
No shows ending this year.

References

 
1970s in New Zealand television